Dogslacks is a farmstead in the Parish of Middlebie, in the Stewartry of Kirkcudbright in Scotland.

References
Dogslacks at the National Archives of Scotland
farmstead at Dogslacks (RCAHMS)

Villages in Dumfries and Galloway